The Fugazi Live Series is a series of live recordings by American post-hardcore band Fugazi, released on CD in 2004 and 2005 and also on the official Dischord Records Fugazi Live Series website for download beginning on December 1, 2011. As of November 2019, 896 concert recordings have been released for download.

Background
Between 1987 and 2003, Fugazi played over 1000 concerts in all 50 US states and all over the world. Over 800 of these shows were recorded by the band's sound engineers. Beginning in 2004 and continuing into 2005, Fugazi launched a 30 CD Live Series that featured concerts from various points in their career, which were made available for sale via Dischord Records. Continuing with the live series concept and after several years of development on December 1, 2011 Fugazi launched a comprehensive Live Series website through Dischord Records that features 130 of the band's concerts available for download at the suggested price of $5 each or a "pay what you want" sliding scale option for each download between $1 – $100 with the goal of eventually making all 800 shows available for purchase. For $500 fans can also purchase an "All Access" privilege which will include access to any future concerts and downloads added to the site.

While each concert was professionally mastered, the recordings capture everything that happened onstage and for preservation's sake the band chose not to edit anything out, singer/guitarist Guy Picciotto explained to the New York Times "“We liked this idea of, ‘Let’s just let it be everything,’ “ Mr. Picciotto said. “There doesn’t have to be the idea that this is the great, golden document. It’s all there, and it’s not cleaned up. You get what you get.” The sound quality also varies as the earliest recordings were made to cassettes, then eventually digital formats such as DAT, CD-R and ultimately hard-drives were used. Each concert page also includes fliers, photographs and ticket stubs. As a career-spanning archival project, the Fugazi Live Series has few equals, putting the band in the company of acts like the Grateful Dead, Phish, and Pearl Jam, some of the only other artists with such a large volume of concerts available for purchase.

CD release: Set One
The first set of twenty live recordings was released in April 2004.
 9-3-87 Washington, DC / Wilson Center
 12-28-87 Washington, DC / DC Space
 10-8-90 Bielefeld, Germany / PC69
 11-6-90 Nancy, France / Terminal Export
 8-17-91 Calgary, Canada / MacKewen Hall
 6-28-92 Berlin, Germany / Tempodrome
 2-14-93 Ft. Lauderdale, Florida / The Edge
 8-7-93 Washington, DC / Washington Monument
 9-4-93 Pontiac, Michigan / Plaza Amphitheater
 11-17-93 Canberra, Australia / Anu Bar
 8-26-94 Curitiba, Brasil / 92 Degrees
 10-9-95 Peoria, Illinois / Expo Center
 10-27-95 Seattle, Washington / DV8
 10-30-96 Sapporo, Japan / Counteraction
 11-2-96 Hong Kong / South Island School Hall
 5-2-97 NYC, New York / NYU Loeb Center
 7-1-97 Dunedin, New Zealand / The Room
 9-3-97 Washington, DC / Wilson Center
 7-24-98 Fredericton, Canada / New Maryland Recreation Center
 5-7-99 Kilkenney, Ireland / Friary Hall

CD release: Set Two
The second set of ten live recordings was released in 2005.
 3-16-90 Gainesville, Florida / American Legion Hall
 10-14-91 Sydney, Australia / Triple J Radio
 5-29-92 Bordeaux, France / Theatre Barbey
 8-9-93 Washington, DC / Fort Reno Park
 8-28-93 Kansas City, Kansas / Memorial Hall
 10-6-99 Geneva, Switzerland / L'usine
 3-27-02 New Orleans, Louisiana / Tipitina's
 10-22-02 Birmingham, UK / The Sanctuary
 10-31-02 Leeds, UK / Metropolitan University Student's Union
 11-4-02 London, UK/ The Forum

References

Fugazi live albums
Live album series
2000s live albums
Self-released albums
Albums produced by Ian MacKaye